The Blériot VII was an early French aeroplane built by Louis Blériot.

Design and development
Following the success with the tandem wing configuration of the Blériot VI, he continued this line of development. The rear wing of his new design was about half the span of the forward wing, a  step towards the configuration that would later be adopted as the basis for the vast majority of aircraft. The tail surfaces could be moved together, to act as elevators, or independently to act as ailerons: one of the first known examples of what would later become called elevons.

On 5 October Blériot began taxying trials at Issy-les-Moulineaux. The aircraft was difficult to control on the ground, and the tests ended when the undercarriage collapsed. Bleriot addressed this issue by redesigning the undercarriage, coming up with the arrangement that was used on nearly all of his subsequent aircraft designs. Each wheel was mounted on a castering trailing arm which was free to slide up and down along the round cross-section vertical members of a fixed, four-sided "bedstead" frame, the movement being sprung by bungee cords.

At the end of November further modifications were made: the wing was moved from its position immediately above the lower longerons to a position about two thirds of the way up the fuselage, and a tubular steel cabane structure was added to take the wing's bracing wires.

In this configuration the aircraft was flown by Blériot on 6 December. On this occasion he succeeded in making a U-turn in the air, and the performance of the aircraft was impressive enough for Patrick Alexander to write "I think Blériot is now leading the way". 

However, the next flight trials, on 18 December, ended with a crash: the left wheel collapsed, causing the wing to dig in and the aircraft to turn over, resulting in its destruction. Blériot escaped without serious injury, his life possibly saved by the cabane structure, which acted as a roll bar.

Specifications

References
Notes

Bibliography
 
 
 
 Devaux, Jean and Michel Marani. "Les Douze Premiers Aéroplanes de Louis Blériot". Pegase No 54, May 1989.

External links

 Nova: A Daring Flight
 earlyaviators.com
 U.S. Centennial of Flight Commission

1900s French experimental aircraft
7
Tandem-wing aircraft
Single-engined tractor aircraft
Aircraft first flown in 1907